Toma Popa (20 April 1908 — 25 February 1962), was a Romanian chess player, Romanian Chess Championship winner (1948).

Biography
From the mid-1930s to the end of the 1940s Toma Popa was one of the strongest Romanian chess players. In 1948, in Bucharest he won Romanian Chess Championship.

Toma Popa played for Romania in the Chess Olympiad:
 In 1935, at reserve board in the 6th Chess Olympiad in Warsaw (+3, =5, -7).

Toma Popa played for Romania in the unofficial Chess Olympiad:
 In 1936, at sixth board in the 3rd unofficial Chess Olympiad in Munich (+7, =5, -7).

Toma Popa played for Romania in the Men's Chess Balkaniads:
 In 1946, at eighth board in the 1st Men's Chess Balkaniad (+1, =2, -0) and won team silver and individual bronze medals,
 In 1947, at seventh board in the 2nd Men's Chess Balkaniad (+1, =0, -1) and won individual silver medal.

References

External links

Toma Popa chess games at 365chess.com

1908 births
1962 deaths
Romanian chess players
Chess Olympiad competitors
20th-century chess players